The Burlington Township School District is a comprehensive community public school district that serves students in pre-kindergarten through twelfth grade from Burlington Township, in Burlington County, New Jersey, United States.

As of the 2021–22 school year, the district, comprised of four schools, had an enrollment of 3,625 students and 328.8 classroom teachers (on an FTE basis), for a student–teacher ratio of 11.0:1.

The district is classified by the New Jersey Department of Education as being in District Factor Group "FG", the fourth-highest of eight groupings. District Factor Groups organize districts statewide to allow comparison by common socioeconomic characteristics of the local districts. From lowest socioeconomic status to highest, the categories are A, B, CD, DE, FG, GH, I and J.

Controversy
The Burlington Township School District received publicity in 2009 after a video posted on YouTube by a parent without school approval showed more than a dozen children at B. Bernice Young Elementary School singing a song praising President Barack Obama, which Conservative groups cited as a means of indoctrinating students to support the President. At the conclusion of the song, the children pump their fists and chant "hip, hip, hooray!" The song had been performed in conjunction with Black History Month activities and when the author of the book I Am Barack Obama visited the school the next month

Schools
Schools in the district (with 2021–22 enrollment data from the National Center for Education Statistics) are:
Elementary schools
B. Bernice Young Elementary School with 763 students in Pre-K to 1st grade
Casey Kocsis, Principal
Fountain Woods Elementary School with 789 students in grades 2-5
April Gittens, Principal
Middle school
Burlington Township Middle School at Springside with 843 students in grades 6-8
Matthew J. Andris, Principal
High school
Burlington Township High School with 1,187 students in grades 9-12
Phil Brownridge, Principal

Administration
Core members of the district's administration are:
Mary Ann Bell, Superintendent
Nicholas Bice, Business Administrator / Board Secretary

Board of education
The district's board of education, comprised of nine members, sets policy and oversees the fiscal and educational operation of the district through its administration. As a Type II school district, the board's trustees are elected directly by voters to serve three-year terms of office on a staggered basis, with three seats up for election each year held (since 2013) as part of the November general election. The board appoints a superintendent to oversee the district's day-to-day operations and a business administrator to supervise the business functions of the district.

References

External links
Burlington Township School District

School Data for the Burlington Township School District, National Center for Education Statistics

Burlington Township, New Jersey
New Jersey District Factor Group FG
School districts in Burlington County, New Jersey